The Newport News Dodgers were a minor league baseball affiliate of the Brooklyn Dodgers between 1944 and 1955. They played in the Piedmont League and were based in Newport News, Virginia.  The teams played at Peninsula War Memorial Stadium on Pembroke Avenue in Hampton, Virginia. The stadium was built by Brooklyn Dodgers President Branch Rickey. The Dodgers played there from 1948-1955. Previously, Newport News teams played at Builders' Park on Warwick Road (1944-1947) and prior to that at a ballpark on Wickham Avenue on the East End of Newport News. The Piedmont League folded after the 1955 season, ending Newport News' franchise.

Newport News won Piedmont League championships in 1946, 1948 and 1954.

Notable Newport News Alumni

Baseball Hall of Fame alumni
 Chief Bender (1941, MGR) Inducted, 1953
 Gil Hodges (1946) Inducted, 2022
 Duke Snider (1944) Inducted, 1980

Notable alumni
 Joe Coleman (1941) MLB All-Star
 Chuck Connors (1946) Actor
 Roger Craig (1951, 1954)
 Johnny Gooch (1919)
 Billy Hunter (1949) MLB All-Star
 Clem Labine (1944, 1947) 2 x MLB All-Star
 Bob Lillis (1951, 1953)
 Danny Ozark (1948)
 Johnny Podres (1951) 4 x MLB All-Star; 1955 World Series Most Valuable Player; 1956 NL ERA Leader
 Ed Roebuck (1950)
 Larry Sherry (1955) 1959 World Series Most Valuable Player
 Norm Sherry (1951, 1954)
 Stan Williams (1955) 2 x MLB All-Star

References

External links
Baseball Reference
Article on the ballpark and team

Defunct minor league baseball teams
Brooklyn Dodgers minor league affiliates
Defunct baseball teams in Virginia
1944 establishments in Virginia
1955 disestablishments in Virginia
Baseball teams established in 1944
Baseball teams disestablished in 1955
Sports in Newport News, Virginia
Piedmont League teams